Sir Dr. Mor Athanasious Eliyas (born Eliyas on 11 February 1964) is a Syriac Orthodox bishop.  he was the Patriarchal vicar of Singapore, President of Antiochean Faith Movement in India and Vicar General of the St. Athanasius Cathedral at the Puthencuriz.

Early years
Athanasious Eliyas was born, in the Kozhiparambath family of Thuruthisserry in Angamali, to Ittoop and Eliyamma (Kooranthazhathu Parambil family, Peechanickad) on 13 April 1964. The family belonged to the Akaparambu Mor Sabor Afroth church in Angamali diocese.

Education 
He had his schooling at the Nedumbasserry Mar Athanasious School and college education at the Angamali DePaul College. He pursued theological studies under Ramban Geevarghese Karimbil (Metropolitan Dionysius Geevarghese) at Dayro d’Ignatius, Manjanikkara. Dr. Athanasious is currently doing research in Trinity under renowned scholar and theologian Commander Prof. Dr. C A Ninan PhD, DSc, DLitt, DD. He is expected to submit the thesis and attend the defense soon.

Ordination 
On 22 July 1988 Dionysius Thomas ordained him as Deacon (Korooyo), and on 15 January 1995 he was ordained as priest (Kassisso). On 2 November 2002, Kassisso Eliyas was elevated to the order of Ramban (Dayroyo) by Catholicos Baselios Thomas I at the Mor Sabor Afroth church in Akaparambu. In November 2006 he was elected to the highest priestly order of the Metropolitan and the decision was later ratified by the Malankara Synod, Working Committee, Managing Committee, the Catholicos and the Patriarch. On Monday 1 January 2007, Catholicos Baselios Thomas I ordained Rabban Eliyas as Metropolitan Athanasious at the St. Athanasius Cathedral, Puthencuriz, in the presence of many religious and government dignitaries.

Athanasious was enthroned on 15 April 2007 at the Mor Sabor Mor Aphroth Church at Akaparambu.  Baselios Thomas I was the chief celebrant and Metropolitans Gregorios Joseph and Chrysostmos Markose were the co-celebrants during the holy ceremony. Athanasious  was appointed as the President of the Antiochean Movement in India and vicar-general of St. Athanasius Cathedral at Puthencuriz Patriarchal center. The Malankara Episcopal Synod held in May 2007 gave him the additional charge of the Malankara Clergy Association.

As a priest 
As a priest he had served the churches at Vadattupara St. George Church, Aymuri St. Thomas Church, Neduvathoor St. George Church, Peechanikad Mount Tabor Church, Angamali St. Mary's Cathedral, Ernakulam St. Peter's Church and Thuruthissery Simhsana Church. For a brief period he had also served as the secretary of Metropolitan Dionysius Thomas.

As a Metropolitan 
Athanasious was appointed as the President of the Antiochean Movement in India and vicar-general of St. Athanasius Cathedral at Puthencuriz Patriarchal center. The Malankara Episcopal Synod held in May 2007 gave him the additional charge of the Malankara Clergy Association. Athanasious also serves as the President of Malankara Evangelical Association, President of Malankara Jacobite Syrian Sunday School Association, Manager of Mar Athanasious Upper Primary School, Thuruthissery and Chairperson of Women Welfare Institute, under Antiochean Movement at Thuruthissery.

Responsibilities 
 Athanasious was
 President of Antiochean Faith Movement in India (Current)
 Chief Patron, Indian Christian Movement (ICM) (Current)
 Vicar General of the St. Athanasius Cathedral at the Puthencuriz, Church HQ, Kerala, INDIA (Current)
 President of Akhila Malankara Suvishesha Mahayogam (Current)
 Metropolitan of Thrissur Diocese of Jacobite Syrian Church (Current)
 Patriarchal Vicar of Singapore & Malaysia (Current)
 Past Patriarchal Vicar of State of Qatar (Past)
 President of the Malankara Clergy Association (Current)
 President of Malankara Evangelical Association (Current)
 President of Malankara Jacobite Syrian Sunday School Association, Aluva District (Past)
 Manager, Mar Athanasious U.P School, Thuruthissery, Kerala (Current)
 Chairperson, Women Welfare Institute, Thuruthissery, Kerala (Current)
 Patron, YMCA, Nedumbasserry (Current)
 Founder Convenor of Nedumbasserry Cochin International Airport

Honors
 Good Shepherd Award from Rotary International (2016)
 Manava Seva Puraskaram (2015)
 Order of St. Michael and Sir title from Teologiska Högskolan Västerbotten, Sweden (2013)
 Doctor of Ministry (D.Min) Degree from Asia Pacific Institute for Theological Research, (2011)
 Mother Teresa award (2010)
 Best Manager Award (2003)

See also
 Syriac Orthodox Church
 Jacobite Syrian Christian Church

References

External links
The personal website of Athanasius Elias
Annual Journal of Asia Pacific Institute for Theological Research, 2011

1964 births
Living people
Syriac Orthodox Church bishops
Indian Oriental Orthodox Christians
People from Angamaly